Berean Christian Academy is located in Don Pedro Yulo Street, Binalbagan, Negros Occidental, Philippines, 6107.

It was founded by Pastor Jether Josh G. Jimena.

The school's philosophy is built on basic principles of the Word of God. Students are taught to see life from God's point of view, to take responsibility for their own learning, and to walk in Godly wisdom and character.

Schools in Negros Occidental
Christian schools in the Philippines